Xanthorrhoea brunonis is a species of grasstree of the genus Xanthorrhoea native to Western Australia.

Description
It blooms between October and December producing white-cream flowers. The non-flowering part of the stem is always longer than the flowering part. It can be differentiated from Xanthorrhoea preissii by its flower.

Taxonomy
The species was first formally described by the botanist Stephan Endlicher in 1846 as part of  Johann Georg Christian Lehmann's work Irideae. Plantae Preissianae.

The genera name Xanthorrhoea is from the Greek words xanthos, meaning "yellow", and rheo, meaning "to flow", referring to the gum which flows from the stem. Brunonis honours Robert Brown , a naturalist on the Flinders expedition.

There are two recognised subspecies:
 Xanthorrhoea brunonis subsp. brunonis	
 Xanthorrhoea brunonis subsp. semibarbata

Distribution
It is found on the Swan Coastal Plain and along the west coast in the Wheatbelt, Peel and South West and the south coast of the Great Southern region of Western Australia. It extends from Dandaragan in the north to Augusta in the south where it grows in sandy-clay soils over laterite.

References

Asparagales of Australia
brunonis
Angiosperms of Western Australia
Plants described in 1846
Endemic flora of Southwest Australia